John W. Shaffer, nicknamed Cannon Ball, (February 18, 1864 – November 21, 1926) was an American baseball player. He played for the 1886 and 1887 New York Metropolitans. He continued to play in the minor leagues through 1897.

External links

1864 births
1926 deaths
19th-century baseball players
Major League Baseball pitchers
New York Metropolitans players
Atlanta Atlantas players
Jersey City Skeeters players
Birmingham Barons players
Birmingham Maroons players
Omaha Omahogs players
Omaha Lambs players
Evansville Hoosiers players
Milton Poets players
Baseball players from Pennsylvania
People from Lock Haven, Pennsylvania